Barnala Kalan is a town in Shahid Bhagat Singh Nagar district in the Indian state of Punjab. It is located 1 km from Nawanshahr city.

References

Cities and towns in Shaheed Bhagat Singh Nagar district